KFAL (900 AM) is a radio station broadcasting a country music format. It is licensed to Fulton, Missouri, and serves the Columbia, Missouri area. The station is owned by the Zimmer Radio Group of Mid-Missouri and features programming from ABC Radio. It also broadcasts on translator 95.3 K237GU.

References

External links

Radio Locator Information for K237GU

FAL